Per Maltby (3 November 1933 – 24 May 2006) was a Norwegian astronomer.

He took his cand.real. degree at the University of Oslo in 1957, and was a research assistant there before becoming lecuter at the University of Bergen in 1960.

His specialties were solar physics and radioastronomy. He took the dr.philos. degree in 1964, was appointed as a lecturer of astrophysics at the University of Oslo in 1967, and was a professor from 1983. He published several books, including textbooks. At his death he was called "the most important pillar of Norwegian astrophysics and space research over the last 40 years".

References

1933 births
2006 deaths
Norwegian astronomers
University of Oslo alumni
Academic staff of the University of Bergen
Academic staff of the University of Oslo